Metal Rendez-vous is the fourth studio album by the Swiss hard rock band Krokus, released in June 1980. It is the first Krokus release to feature vocalist Marc Storace; Chris von Rohr had formerly served as the band's lead vocalist but appears on Metal Rendez-vous as the band's bassist. The track "Heatstrokes" charted number one in the British Heavy Metal Charts, and arguably opened up markets for Krokus in Britain and the United States, along with "Bedside Radio" and "Tokyo Nights". Strangely, the song "Tokyo Nights" features a reggae beat halfway through. The album sold more than 150,000 copies in Switzerland and was certified Triple Platinum.

UK-based company Rock Candy Records reissued the album on CD in 2014.

Seven of the songs on Metal Rendez-vous - "Heatstrokes", "Bedside Radio", "Streamer", "Shy Kid", "Tokyo Nights", "Lady Double Dealer", and "Fire" - along with an eighth song, titled "Sweet Inspiration", were originally demoed with singer Henry Fries who fronted the band for a period in 1978/'79 before being replaced by Storace.  The Fries demos are available digitally on iTunes under the name Henry Fries & Friends.  In 1982, Fries and fellow Krokus alumni, Jürg Naegeli and Tommy Kiefer, would release the album Downtown Cocktail under the name Henry Freis & The Cityleaders.

Track listing
All songs written by Fernando von Arb and Chris von Rohr, except "Bedside Radio" and "Back-Seat Rock 'n' Roll" by von Arb, von Rohr and Jürg Naegeli.
Side one
 "Heatstrokes" - 4:00
 "Bedside Radio" - 3:22
 "Come On" - 4:29
 "Streamer" - 6:44
 "Shy Kid" - 2:33

Side two
"Tokyo Nights" - 5:54
 "Lady Double Dealer" - 3:13
 "Fire" - 6:07
 "No Way" - 4:02
 "Back-Seat Rock 'n' Roll" - 3:15

(A re-recording of "Back-Seat Rock n' Roll" appears on the band's 2017 covers album Big Rocks).

Personnel
Krokus
Marc Storace – lead vocals
Fernando von Arb – rhythm guitar, keyboards, bass, backing vocals
Tommy Kiefer – lead guitar, backing vocals
Chris von Rohr – bass, backing vocals, percussion, drums, keyboards
Freddy Steady – drums, percussion, backing vocals
Jürg Naegeli – keyboards, bass, backing vocals, assistant engineer

Production
Martin Pearson – producer, engineer
Ursli Weber – assistant engineer

Certifications

References

Krokus (band) albums
1980 albums
Ariola Records albums